Magnetic Morning (formerly known as The Setting Suns) is an indie rock duo made up of Swervedriver singer/guitarist and solo artist Adam Franklin and Interpol drummer Sam Fogarino. The two met in early 2006 in New York City when they were introduced over dinner by long term, mutual friend, Jack Rabid and officially formed at the end of 2006.

Magnetic Morning released their debut six-track EP as "The Setting Suns" on iTunes on 18 October 2007. Soon after, they renamed their collaboration after a 2003 song by Franklin's moniker Toshack Highway "due to an already existing entity with a name too close for comfort". A five-track CD version of EP was released through DH Records on 19 April 2008.  Magnetic Morning followed with their first full-length album A.M. a little over a year later in January 2009.

Discography

The Setting Suns EP

Details
Released: 18 October 2007
Label: DH Records / Friend or Faux Recordings
Format: digital download, CD

Track listing

A.M.

Details
Released: 27 January 2009
Label: Friend or Faux
Format: LP, CD

Track listing

References

External links
Magnetic Morning on Myspace

Indie rock musical groups from New York (state)
Musical groups from New York City